The 2008 WAFF Championship was the fifth West Asian Football Federation Championship, an international tournament for West Asian countries and territories. It was hosted by Iran.

Teams 
Six teams entered the tournament.
  (Hosts)
 
 
 
  (Invited Nation)
  (Invited Nation)
  Withdrew from the tournament on 26 June 2008 due to the team being disbanded.
  Were invited as guests but withdrew after being told that they could not play with their Olympic team.
  the initial hosts of this tournament, would not participate in this edition.

Draw 
The draw for the competition was made on 1 July 2008 in Amman, Jordan.

Venues

Group stage

Group A

Group B

Knockout phase

Semi-finals

Final

Champions

References

External links 
 Rsssf.com

2008
2008
2008 in Asian football
2008–09 in Jordanian football
2008–09 in Iranian football
2008–09 in Qatari football
2008–09 in Syrian football
2008–09 in Omani football
2008 in Palestinian football